Mary Anne O'Connor (born October 1, 1953) is an American Olympian who competed in the 1976 Summer Olympics on the first US Olympic women's basketball team.

Early life

O'Connor was born in Bridgeport, Connecticut, the first child of six to Marie Roberts O'Connor and Raymond O'Connor. She grew up in Fairfield, Connecticut. Her mother graduated from the University of Connecticut and was a forward on the women's basketball team. She had a career as an RN and after earning her MS at Fairfield University, became a nursing professor. Her father Raymond graduated from Fairfield University where he was President of the Glee Club and later earned his MS. He had a career teaching science in Fairfield, Connecticut public schools.

Athletic accomplishments

High school
O'Connor attended Notre Dame Girls High School in Bridgeport Connecticut and lettered in three sports: softball, field hockey, and basketball. Joining her on all three teams was her younger sister Eileen. Both O'Connor's were on the basketball team during two undefeated seasons in 1970 and 1971. They were coached by Ann DeLuca, who also played semi-professional softball with the Raybestos Brakettes. Mary Anne also swam competitively along with all 5 of her siblings: Eileen, Peggy, John, Katy, and Patrick.

College
O'Connor attended Southern Connecticut State University and in her freshman year, she was selected to play on the varsity basketball team. Southern's team was ranked third in the nation in '73 and '74. She was a member of Southern's team that reached the semi-finals of the Nationals in 1973, 1974, and 1975, coached by Louise O'Neal. Teammates included her sister Eileen, Joan Bonvicini, and Sue Rojcewicz the latter of whom later joined her as a player on both the 1975 US National and 1976 Olympic teams. O'Connor was an All American  and was selected for the US National Team in 1974 and 1975. She was awarded the Outstanding Scholar Athlete Award in 1975 was inducted into the SCSU Hall of Fame in 1987.  Following graduation, O'Connor took an Assistant Coach position at Southern  and helped coach the team to the Nationals in 1976.

Olympics and international competition
As a member of the 1974 US National team, O'Connor toured the US playing in six exhibition games against the USSR. In 1975, she was on the team that competed at the FIBA World Championship games in Colombia  where the United States compiled a 4–3 record and finished in eighth place. O'Connor was the second leading scorer on the team, averaging 10.9 points per game. At the Pan AM games in Mexico City,  they won the gold medal. As a member of the 1976 US Olympic basketball team, O'Connor won a Silver Medal in the Summer Olympics in Montreal.

Professional
Shortly after the Olympics, O'Connor moved to France after being recruited by a French basketball team, Clermont UC (CUC).  She played for them for two years along with the French international star, Irene Guidotti. Other teammates included Dominique LeRay and Élisabeth Riffiod, whose son Boris Diaw played in the NBA (2003–2017). O'Connor was on the team as they continued their reign as French national champions in 1977  and 1978. In 1977 they were also finalists in the European Cup of Champions (Coupe de Europe).
In 1978, Mary Anne moved to Paris and played for Stade Francais  
for six years along with Guidotti, LeRay, and Paoline Ekambi. At the time, the team had just come up to Division One and went on to become the national champion, Championne de France, in 1980  1983, and 1984.Photo of Mary Anne – jersey 14- and her teammates in 1984

Other professional
After retiring from basketball, O'Connor earned her MBA from University of Hartford, Paris and worked at a French company that provided European financial data to the markets in London and New York.  She returned to the US in 1990 and worked as an independent IT consultant in New York City. O'Connor relocated to California in 1992 and co-founded an IT and Operations consulting firm in the San Francisco Bay area, O'Connor and Harrigan Associates, LLC, where she continues to consult.

Personal life
O'Connor and Ada Harrigan married in 2014. As of 2021, they have been together for thirty years.

Honors and Hall of Fame Inductions
 Notre Dame High School Hall of Fame, 1986 (softball and basketball)
 Preseason All-American, 1974–1975 
 Southern Connecticut State University Hall of Fame, 1987 
 Connecticut Women's Basketball Hall of Fame, 1988 
 New England Basketball Hall of Fame, 2003 
 Stade Francais Centennial Award, 1983, awarded by the French Minister of Sport
 Women Institute on Sport and Education Hall of Fame, 1996
 Women's Basketball Hall of Fame, 1976 Olympic team member, "Trailblazers of the Game", June 2014

Notes

References

External links
 Connecticut Women's Basketball Hall Of Fame, inducted 1988
 Championnat Féminin de Basket-Ball
 Stade Francais, Women's Basketball
 Clermont UC (CUC), Women's Basketball

1953 births
Living people
American expatriate basketball people in France
American women's basketball players
Basketball players at the 1975 Pan American Games
Basketball players at the 1976 Summer Olympics
Basketball players from Connecticut
College women's basketball players in the United States
Fairfield University alumni
Medalists at the 1976 Summer Olympics
Olympic silver medalists for the United States in basketball
Pan American Games gold medalists for the United States
Southern Connecticut State University alumni
Pan American Games medalists in basketball
Medalists at the 1975 Pan American Games
United States women's national basketball team players